Rozelle is a surname. Notable people with the surname include:

Carrie Rozelle (1937–2007), Canadian-born American disabilities activist
Pete Rozelle (1926–1996), American businessman executive
Ron Rozelle, American author
Scott Rozelle (born 1955), American development economist

See also
Rozelle (given name)